The 2024 United States House of Representatives elections in Wisconsin will be held on November 5, 2024, to elect the eight U.S. representatives from the State of Wisconsin, one from each of the state's congressional districts. The elections will coincide with the 2024 U.S. presidential election, as well as other elections to the House of Representatives, elections to the United States Senate, and various state and local elections.

District 1

The 1st district encompasses the southeastern corner of Wisconsin, containting Janesville, Kenosha, and Racine. The incumbent is Republican Bryan Steil, who was elected with 54.1% of the vote in 2022.

Republican primary

Candidates

Publicly expressed interest
Bryan Steil, incumbent U.S. Representative

General election

Predictions

District 3

The 3rd district takes in the Driftless Area in southwestern Wisconsin including Eau Claire and La Crosse. The incumbent is Republican Derrick Van Orden, who flipped the district and was elected with 51.9% of the vote in 2022.

Republican primary

Candidates

Potential
Derrick Van Orden, incumbent U.S. Representative

General election

Predictions

District 5

The 5th district takes in the northern and western suburbs of Milwaukee, including Washington County, Jefferson County, as well as most of Waukesha County. The incumbent is Republican Scott Fitzgerald, who was reelected with 64.4% of the vote in 2022.

Republican primary

Candidates

Potential
Scott Fitzgerald, incumbent U.S. Representative

Democratic primary

Candidates

Declared
Chris Leon, supply chain specialist

General election

Predictions

District 6

The 6th district is based in east-central Wisconsin, encompassing part of the Fox River Valley, and takes in Fond du Lac, Oshkosh, and Sheboygan. The incumbent is Republican Glenn Grothman, who was reelected with 94.9% of the vote in 2022.

Republican primary

Candidates

Declared
Glenn Grothman, incumbent U.S. Representative

General election

Predictions

References

2024
Wisconsin
United States House of Representatives